Little Mo  is a 1978 American made-for-television biographical film telling the life story of Maureen Connolly (September 17, 1934 – June 21, 1969), the 1950s American tennis player who was the first woman to win all four Grand Slam tournaments during the same calendar year, before an accident ended her tennis career at age 19. It stars Glynnis O'Connor, Michael Learned, Anne Baxter, Mark Harmon (as her husband Norman Brinker) and Leslie Nielsen.

Cast

Main cast
 Michael Learned as Eleanor 'Teach' Tennant
 Anne Baxter as Jessamyn Connolly
 Glynnis O'Connor as Maureen Connolly
 Claude Akins as Gus Berste
 Anne Francis as Sophie Fisher
 Mark Harmon as Norman Brinker
 Martin Milner as Wilbur Folsom
 Leslie Nielsen as Nelson Fisher
 Tony Trabert as Himself
 Ann Doran as Aunt Gert
 Fred Holliday as Dr. Bruce Kimball
 Len Wayland as Johnson
 Justin Lord as Maxwell
 Maggie Wellman as Susan
 Jean Kar as Nancy Chaffee
 Cindy Brinker as Susan Partridge
 K.C. Kiner as Laura Lou Jahn
 Tory Fretz as Doris Hart
 Stacy Keach Sr. as Chamber of Commerce President
 Beatrice Manley as Duchess of Kent
 Jason Kincaid as Ben
 Tracey Gold as Cindy Brinker
 Missy Gold as Brenda Brinker
 Howard Culver as Tennis Match Announcer

Supporting cast
 Ian Abercrombie as Dr. Noyes (uncredited)

Historical inaccuracies
It is strongly implied that Connolly's dramatic Wimbledon match versus Britain's Sue Partridge was the first singles match that Connolly played that year at the 1952 Wimbledon tournament.  It was actually a fourth-round match.

The final scene, in which Connolly and her former coach (Eleanor Tennant) are dramatically reunited at a public tennis court near the end of Connolly's life, never occurred.

External links

1978 television films
1978 films
1970s biographical films
American biographical films
Biographical films about sportspeople
Cultural depictions of American women
Cultural depictions of tennis players
Films directed by Daniel Haller
Films set in the 1950s
NBC network original films
Sports films based on actual events
Tennis films
1970s English-language films
1970s American films